is a Japanese author and television personality.

Early life 
Sawako Agawa was born in Tokyo on 1 November 1953. Her father is the novelist Hiroyuki Agawa; and her elder brother Naoyuki Agawa is also a writer. Naoyuki is a former diplomat who, since 1999, has been a professor of law at Keio University.

After graduation from Toyo Eiwa junior high school and high school (private all-girls school, Christian school located in Minato, Tokyo), Agawa graduated from Keio University with the Bachelor of Letters degree in Western Historiography.

Career 
Agawa started her career in Japanese television, first as a reporter, then as a news reader. She appears on a variety of programs, including talk shows, quiz programs, and interview shows.

Filmography

Films
 Nishino Yukihiko no Koi to Bōken (2014), Sayuri Sasaki
 Homestay (2022)
 Egoist (2023)

Television
 Toto Neechan (2016), Shizuko Sawa
 Rikuoh (2017), Akemi Masaoka
 Anata no Soba de Ashita ga Warau (2021)

References

External links 
 Profile 

Writers from Tokyo
Keio University alumni
Japanese television personalities
Japanese essayists
Living people
1953 births